Rabbit Lake is a small lake in the municipality of Markstay-Warren, Sudbury District in Northeastern Ontario, Canada. The lake exits at the northeast via an unnamed creek, then flows via the Veuve River, Lake Nipissing and the French River to Georgian Bay on Lake Huron.

References

Other map sources:

Lakes of Sudbury District